Colonie may refer to:

 Colonie (town), New York
 Colonie (village), New York
 La Colonie, an 18th-century French comedy play